Lake Eaton is a lake located west of Long Lake, New York. Fish species present in the lake are brook trout, lake trout, lake whitefish, smallmouth bass, landlocked salmon, brown trout, and rainbow trout. There is a state owned beach launch located in the campground on Route 30, 2 miles west of Long Lake.

References

Lakes of Hamilton County, New York
Lakes of New York (state)